Sir James Cornelius O'Dowd  (1829 – 15 December 1903) was deputy Judge Advocate General. He was knighted at Windsor Castle in 1900.

O'Dowd was the son of James Klyne O'Dowd (1802–1879), a barrister of Castlebar, Mayo. He was a student of the Middle Temple from 15 November 1853, aged 24 years, and he was called to the bar 26 January 1859. He died on 15 December 1903 and was buried at St Mary's Roman Catholic Cemetery, Kensal Green.

References 

1829 births
1903 deaths
Alumni of Trinity College Dublin
Knights Bachelor
Companions of the Order of the Bath
Members of the Middle Temple
People from Castlebar